Metropolitan Magazine can refer to:
Metropolitan Magazine (New York City), later known as Macfadden's Fiction Lover's Magazine, was a monthly periodical in the early 20th century with articles on politics and literature
The Metropolitan Magazine, a London monthly published 1831–1850

See also
Metro Magazine, an American rail transport trade magazine
Metro (magazine), a New Zealand lifestyle magazine